John Mark Vander Poel (born March 5, 1968) is a former American football offensive tackle. He played college football at University of Colorado for the Colorado Buffaloes and in the National Football League for the Indianapolis Colts.

College career

Vander Poel played college football for the Colorado Buffaloes from 1987 to 1990. On his last season with Colorado, he made the all Big Eight team.

Professional career

Vander Poel was drafted by the Indianapolis Colts in the fourth round of the 1991 NFL Draft. He made his first start with the Colts in October 1991. After being released by the Colts in 1993, he signed with the Arizona Cardinals where he would play before retiring after the 1994 season.

References

External links
NFL stats
Pro Football Reference stats

1968 births
Living people
People from Upland, California
Sportspeople from San Bernardino County, California
Players of American football from California
American football offensive tackles
Colorado Buffaloes football players
Indianapolis Colts players
Arizona Cardinals players